Ampoigné is a former commune in the Mayenne department in northwestern France. On 1 January 2018, it was merged into the new commune of Prée-d'Anjou.

Population

Personalities linked to the commune 
 Antoine de la Garanderie (born and buried in Ampoigné), educator and philosopher.

See also
Communes of Mayenne

References

Former communes of Mayenne
Populated places disestablished in 2018